The 2023 MAC women's basketball tournament was the postseason basketball tournament that ends the 2022–23 college basketball season in the Mid-American Conference (MAC). The entire tournament was held at Rocket Mortgage FieldHouse, in Cleveland, Ohio between March 8 and 11. Toledo defeated Bowling Green in the final to earn the conference's automatic bid into the 2023 NCAA tournament. Quinesha Lockett of Toledo was the MVP.

Format
As with the 2021, and 2022 tournament, only the top eight teams qualify. The winner of the tournament received the MAC's automatic bid to the 2023 NCAA tournament.

Venue
The 2022 MAC tournament was held at Rocket Mortgage FieldHouse for the 23rd consecutive season.  The venue was the home of the Cleveland Cavaliers of the NBA, has a capacity for basketball of 19,432, and is located in downtown Cleveland at One Center Court.

Seeds
Eight out of the 12 MAC teams qualified for the tournament. Teams were seeded by record within the conference, with a tiebreaker system to seed teams with identical conference records.

Schedule

Source

Bracket

 - indicates overtime

All-Tournament team
Tournament MVP – 

Source

See also
2023 MAC men's basketball tournament

References

Mid-American Conference women's basketball tournament
2022–23 Mid-American Conference women's basketball season
MAC women's basketball tournament
Basketball competitions in Cleveland
College basketball tournaments in Ohio
Women's sports in Ohio
2020s in Cleveland